This is a list of General Hospital character lists.

General
 List of General Hospital characters
 List of General Hospital: Night Shift characters

By decade
 List of General Hospital characters of the 1960s
 List of General Hospital characters of the 1970s
 List of General Hospital characters of the 1980s
 List of General Hospital characters of the 1990s
 List of General Hospital characters of the 2000s
 List of General Hospital characters of the 2010s

Families
Hardy/Webber family
Scorpio/Jones family
Spencer family
Quartermaine family
Cassadine family
Jerome family
Corinthos family
Lord family
Cramer family

See also
 Children of General Hospital
 List of General Hospital cast members
 List of previous General Hospital cast members

 
General Hospital